Meem (in Arabic م ) is a Lebanese LBTQ women's group that was founded in August 2007, the first ever lesbian organization established in the Arab World. The full name is مجموعة مؤازرة للمرأة المثليّة, pronounced /Majmou3at Mou'azara lil Mar’a al-Mithliya/ (translated as Support Group for Lesbian Women). The name "Meem" is derived from the Arabic letter م (the letter m, which is called "meem"). The letter "meem" as an initial for the word lesbian (in Arabic مثليّة pronounced /mithliya/) also symbolizes the anonymity of lesbians in the Arab world.

Membership has risen above 200.

Meem was partially formed through mutual inspiration via the Lebanese LGBT organization Helem, though with focus on a comparatively less visible political strategy and a flatter organizational structure than Helem.

Aims
The group offers community support, psychological counseling, an activity center, legal support, social events, and the opportunity to work on social change. Meem also hosts a Womyn House that serves as an activity and resource center in Beirut.

The goal of Meem is to create a safe space in Lebanon where lesbians can meet, talk, discuss issues, share experiences, and work on improving their lives and themselves.

Membership
Membership in Meem is restricted only to LBTQ women who are Lebanese (anywhere in the world) or living in Lebanon (of any nationality).

Publications
In 2009, Meem published "Bareed Mista3jil." Available in both English and Arabic versions, the book is a collection of 41 true and personal stories from lesbians, bisexuals, queer and questioning women, and transgender persons from all over Lebanon.

See also

Helem
LGBT rights in Lebanon
List of LGBT rights organisations

References

External links
Meem Official website

2007 establishments in Lebanon
Lesbian culture in Asia
Lesbian organizations
LGBT political advocacy groups in Lebanon
Organizations established in 2007
Women's organisations based in Lebanon